A list of films produced in South Korea in 1980:

References

External links
1980 in South Korea

 1980-1989 at www.koreanfilm.org

1980
South Korean
1980 in South Korea